"Here Comes the Rain" is a song written by Raul Malo and Kostas, and recorded by American country music group The Mavericks. It was released in August 1995 as the first single from the album Music for All Occasions.  The song reached number 22 on the Billboard Hot Country Singles & Tracks chart and peaked at number 4 on the RPM Country Tracks chart in Canada. It also won The Mavericks the 1996 Grammy Award for Best Country Performance by a Duo or Group with Vocal.

Music video
The music video was directed by Gerry Wenner and premiered in 1995.

Chart performance
"Here Comes the Rain" debuted at number 72 on the U.S. Billboard Hot Country Singles & Tracks for the week of August 19, 1995.

Year-end charts

References

1995 singles
1995 songs
The Mavericks songs
Songs written by Kostas (songwriter)
Song recordings produced by Don Cook
MCA Records singles
Songs written by Raul Malo